Claudio Paris (born 31 March 1971 in Argentina) is an Argentinean retired footballer.

References

1973 births
Living people
Association football midfielders
Argentine footballers
Argentine Primera División players
Serie A players
Newell's Old Boys footballers
Estudiantes de La Plata footballers
A.C. Perugia Calcio players
Racing Club de Avellaneda footballers
Argentine expatriate footballers
Expatriate footballers in Italy